Jameson Mukombwe (born 5 July 1991) is a Zimbabwean footballer who plays as a defender for Triangle United and the Zimbabwe national football team.

References

External links

1991 births
Living people
Zimbabwe Premier Soccer League players
Zimbabwean footballers
Zimbabwe international footballers
Black Rhinos F.C. players
Chapungu United F.C. players
F.C. Platinum players
Association football defenders